or  is a lake in the municipality of Hattfjelldal in Nordland county, Norway.  It is a good lake for fishing lake trout and Arctic char both during summer and winter. The river flowing into the lake from the east is called Skarmodalselva, and the outflowing river is called Unkerelva (which itself flows into the river Vefsna). For tourists, there are two places available by the shoreside: Ørnes camping at the eastern end of the lake, and Tjolmen, situated on the north side of the lake's middle.  The road from the village of Hattfjelldal to the village of Dikanäs in Sweden runs along the north side of the lake.

See also
 List of lakes in Norway
 Geography of Norway

References

Lakes of Nordland
Hattfjelldal